Preah Keo II (born Ang Chee; 1652–1677) also known as Kaev Hua II or Keo Fa II was a Cambodian king from 1673 to 1674. He was the son of Barom Reachea V.

During his reign Preah Keo II came into conflict with Prince Ang Nan. With the help of the Ayutthaya Kingdom, he drove out Ang Nan to Vietnam. Ang Nan sought help from the Vietnamese Nguyễn lord and the Vietnamese army under Nguyễn Dương Lâm and Nguyễn Đình Phái invaded Cambodia, captured Prey Nokor (Saigon), then attacked Phnom Penh. Preah Keo II was defeated, and retreated into forest. There, he continued fighting against the Vietnamese until he was killed in 1677.

References

 Chroniques Royales du Cambodge de 1594 à 1677. École française d'Extrême Orient, Paris, 1981 
 Achille Dauphin-Meunier, Histoire du Cambodge, Presses universitaires de France, Paris, 1968, Que sais-je ? n° 916. 

1652 births
1677 deaths
17th-century Cambodian monarchs
Monarchs who abdicated